Jeremy Coon (born 1979) is an American executive producer and editor of the 2004 film Napoleon Dynamite, a cult hit made on a $400,000 budget that has earned more than $44 million since its release.

Education 
Coon attended film school at Brigham Young University and graduated in 1997 from Lloyd V. Berkner High School in Richardson, Texas.

Career 
He was friends at Brigham Young with fellow film student Jared Hess, where he was told of Hess' nascent screenplay for Dynamite and agreed to raise the money to produce the film. On the opening day of the 2004 Sundance Film Festival, Coon sold the film to Fox Searchlight Pictures for $3.2 million.

After a 22-day shoot in Preston, Idaho, Coon edited the film during a nine-day cram session using Apple Final Cut Pro software for the first time. "We spent about a year assembling our crew -- 95 percent were friends from the BYU post department," he told the Apple publication Pro. "People would come by to check on me and I didn’t even know what time of day it was."

Coon co-directed Raiders!: The Story of the Greatest Fan Film Ever Made and the upcoming A Disturbance in the Force about the making of the Star Wars Holiday Special.

References

External links

 
Apple Pro interview
MovieMaker interview

American film producers
Brigham Young University alumni
Living people
Place of birth missing (living people)
1979 births